Atchison High School is a public secondary school in Atchison, Kansas, United States, operated by Atchison USD 409 school district, and serves students of grades 9 to 12.

Notable alumni
 Chester Mize (1917–1994), Republican member of the United States House of Representatives from Kansas
 John Swayze (1906–1995), news commentator, spokesperson, game show panelist during the 1950s, graduated in 1924

See also
 List of high schools in Kansas
 List of unified school districts in Kansas

References

External links
 Official website
 USD 409

Public high schools in Kansas
Schools in Atchison County, Kansas